Ethan Katzberg is a Canadian hammer thrower. He competed at the 2022 Commonwealth Games, winning the silver medal in the men's hammer throw. He is hoping to compete at the 2024 Summer Olympics.

Katzberg competed at the 2021 World Athletics U20 Championships in the men's hammer throw, but finished outside the medal positions. He is a former member of the Nanaimo Track and Field Club.

References

External links 

Living people
Place of birth missing (living people)
Year of birth missing (living people)
Canadian male hammer throwers
Athletes (track and field) at the 2022 Commonwealth Games
Commonwealth Games silver medallists for Canada
21st-century Canadian people
Commonwealth Games medallists in athletics
Medallists at the 2022 Commonwealth Games